Jesús María "Pepe" Frías Andújar (born July 14, 1948) is a Dominican former professional baseball shortstop. He played in Major League Baseball (MLB) for the Montreal Expos, Atlanta Braves, Texas Rangers, and Los Angeles Dodgers between 1973 and 1981.

References

External links

1948 births
Living people
Astros de Tampico players
Atlanta Braves players
Cafeteros de Córdoba players
Decatur Commodores players
Dominican Republic expatriate baseball players in Canada
Dominican Republic expatriate baseball players in Mexico
Dominican Republic expatriate baseball players in the United States
Evansville Triplets players
Florida Instructional League Expos players
Fort Myers Sun Sox players
Jacksonville Suns players

Los Angeles Dodgers players
Major League Baseball players from the Dominican Republic
Major League Baseball shortstops
Mexican League baseball players
Montreal Expos players
Sportspeople from San Pedro de Macorís
Québec Carnavals players
Salt Lake City Giants players
Texas Rangers players
Wichita Aeros players
Winnipeg Whips players